Septimus Francom (14 September 1882 – 15 March 1965) was a British long-distance runner. He competed in the marathon at the 1912 Summer Olympics.

References

1882 births
1965 deaths
Athletes (track and field) at the 1912 Summer Olympics
British male long-distance runners
British male marathon runners
Olympic athletes of Great Britain
People from Thingwall